"Lady Stardust" is a song written by English singer-songwriter David Bowie that appeared on the album The Rise and Fall of Ziggy Stardust and the Spiders from Mars (1972). Co-produced by Ken Scott, Bowie recorded it with his backing band the Spiders from Mars – comprising Mick Ronson, Trevor Bolder and Mick Woodmansey. The song is generally interpreted as alluding to fellow glam rock icon Marc Bolan. The original demo version was entitled "He Was Alright (A Song for Marc)". A 4-track demo version of the song was sold as a picture disc single during the "David Bowie Is" exhibition in Japan in 2017.

Composition and recording
Bowie recorded "Lady Stardust" on 12 November 1971 at Trident Studios in London for inclusion on The Rise and Fall of Ziggy Stardust and the Spiders from Mars. Co-produced by Ken Scott, the lineup consisted of Bowie's backing band known as the Spiders from Mars—comprising guitarist Mick Ronson, bassist Trevor Bolder and drummer Mick Woodmansey. Also recorded on this day were "Soul Love", "Moonage Daydream" and a re-recording of The Man Who Sold the World track "The Supermen".

Live versions
Bowie played the song at the BBC show Sounds of the 70s with Bob Harris on 23 May 1972. This was broadcast on 19 June 1972 and in 2000 was released on the album Bowie at the Beeb.

Personnel
Personnel per Kevin Cann.
David Bowie – lead vocals, acoustic guitar
Mick Ronson – piano, backing vocals
Trevor Bolder – bass guitar
Mick Woodmansey – drums

Other releases
 The original demo version of the song, recorded in March 1971, was released as a bonus track on the Rykodisc CD release of Ziggy Stardust in 1990. This also appeared on the Ziggy Stardust – 30th Anniversary Reissue bonus disc in 2002.
 The song appeared on the Russian compilation Starman in 1989.
 A November 1996 recording of the song, which originally aired on a BBC radio broadcast in 1997, was released in 2020 on the album ChangesNowBowie.

References

Sources

 

David Bowie songs
1972 songs
Rock ballads
Songs written by David Bowie
Song recordings produced by Ken Scott
Song recordings produced by David Bowie
1970s ballads